is a Japanese taekwondo practitioner and a kickboxer. He won the tournament of R.I.S.E. at welterweight in 2006. As a martial artist, he practises the full-contact version of taekwondo, and has competed in numerous competitions. His rank is 2nd dan black belt certified by the Japan Taekwondo Association.

Biography

Youth
Keiji Ozaki was born on April 24, 1980 in the prefecture of Kanagawa, Japan. He spent his young age in United States, in Murrysville, PA until he was halfway through high school. After coming to a Japanese high school, he started practicing finswimming. He participated in the Japanese national championship of swimming for 5 different disciplines in 1999, and he won 5 gold medals at 5 disciplines. After graduation of high school, he entered Kanagawa University and he joined its taekwondo team.

Taekwondo era
In 2000, he won the gold medal of Japanese national championship for undergraduates in full contact taekwondo at open weight. In 2002 and 2003, he won the national championships for adults.

Professional kickboxing
In March 2000, he joined Team Dragon and started practicing kickboxing. On September 28, 2003, he debuted on R.I.S.E., one of the kickboxing promoting and sanctioning body, as a professional kickboxer. He fought against Tomoaki Suehiro, and won by unanimous decision.

On December 17, 2006, he won the "R.I.S.E. Dead or Alive tournament '06".

K-1
Ozaki was offered by K-1, and he participated K-1 to prove the strength of taekwondo.

He defeated Masanobu Goto by a clear unanimous decision at Krush-EX 2012 vol.5 on October 21, 2012 at Shinjuki Face in Tokyo. He floored Goto four times in the fight.

He lost to Jessy Petit-Jean in a fight for the WKN World Lightweight Kickboxing Championship on November 17, 2012 in Liège, Belgium.

He lost a majority decision to Hiroya in a non-tournament bout at Krush Grand Prix 2013 ~67kg Tournament First Round~ on January 14, 2013 in Tokyo.

Ozaki faced fellow taekwondo stylist Seiji Takahashi at NJKF: 2013 3rd in Tokyo on April 29, 2013.

Titles
Professional
2006 R.I.S.E. Dead Or Alive Tournament '06 champion
Amateur
11th Kanagawa Prefecture Taekwondo Championship winner (2000)
12th Kanagawa Prefecture Taekwondo Championship Full contact Openweight winner (July 15, 2001)
4th Tokyo Taekwondo Championship Full contact Openweight winner (October 8, 2001)
Chubu Taekwondo Championship winner (2000)
12th All Japan University Taekwondo Championship Full contact Openweight winner (2000)
13th All Japan University Taekwondo Championship Full contact Openweight winner (December 7, 2001)
14th All Japan University Taekwondo Championship Kumite Openweight winner (September 16, 2002)
All Japan Taekwondo Championship 3rd place (2001)
13th All Japan Full contact Taekwondo Championship Kumite Openweight winner (December 28, 2002)
14th All Japan Full contact Taekwondo Championship winner (November 29, 2003)

Kickboxing record

|-  style="background:#cfc;"
| 2014-10-05 ||Win ||align=left| Keisuke Kurihara|| Krush 46 || Tokyo, Japan || Decision (Unanimous)|| 3|| 3:00||  27-22-1
|-  style="background:#fbb;"
| 2014-06-12 ||Loss ||align=left| Ikki|| Krush 42 || Tokyo, Japan || Decision (Unanimous)|| 3|| 3:00||  26-22-1
|-  style="background:#fbb;"
| 2014-01-04 ||Loss ||align=left| Taito || Krush 37, -65 kg Championship Tournament, First Round || Tokyo, Japan || Decision (Unanimous)|| 3|| 3:00||  26-21-1
|-  style="background:#fbb;"
| 2013-09-01 ||Loss ||align=left| Toshiki Taniyama || Bigbang 14 || Tokyo, Japan || Ext.R Decision (Unanimous)|| 4|| 3:00||  26-20-1
|-
! style=background:white colspan=9 |
|-  style="background:#fbb;"
| 2013-04-29 ||Loss ||align=left| Seiji Takahashi || NJKF: 2013 3rd || Tokyo, Japan || Decision (Unanimous)|| 3|| 3:00||  26-19-1
|-  style="background:#fbb;"
| 2013-01-14 || Loss ||align=left| Hiroya|| Krush Grand Prix 2013 ~67 kg Tournament First Round~ ||Tokyo, Japan || Decision (majority) || 3 || 3:00 || 26-18-1
|-  style="background:#fbb;"
| 2012-11-17 || Loss ||align=left| Jessy Petit-Jean|| La Nuit Du Kick Boxing || Liège, Belgium || || || || 26-17-1
|-
! style=background:white colspan=9 |
|-  style="background:#cfc;"
| 2012-10-21 ||Win||align=left| Masanobu Goto|| Krush-EX 2012 vol.5 ||Tokyo, Japan|| Decision (Unanimous) || 3 ||  || 26-16-1
|-  style="background:#fbb;"
| 2012-06-26 || Loss ||align=left| Taito|| Krush. 22 ||Tokyo, Japan|| Unanimous Decision || 3 || || 25-16-1
|-  style="background:#cfc;"
| 2012-07-19 ||Win||align=left| Ding Ning|| Krush.19||Tokyo, Japan|| Decision (Unanimous) || 3 ||  || 25-15-1
|-  style="background:#cfc;"
| 2012-01-09 || Win ||align=left| Hironori Hattori || Krush.15 || Tokyo, Japan || KO || 2 || 0:37 || 24-15-1
|-  style="background:#fbb;"
| 2011-10-22 || Loss ||align=left| Roman Mailov || W5 Grand Prix K.O.  || Moscow, Russia || Decision (Unanimous) || 3 || 3:00 || 23-15-1
|-  style="background:#fbb;"
| 2011-08-14 || Loss ||align=left| Thomas Adamandopoulos || Krush.11 || Tokyo, Japan || Decision (Unanimous) || 5 || 3:00 || 23-14-1
|-
! style=background:white colspan=9 |
|-  style="background:#cfc;"
| 2011-05-29 || Win ||align=left| Park || Krush -70 kg First Generation Championship Tournament ~Round.1~|| Korakuen Hall, Tokyo, Japan || Decision || 3 || 3:00 || 23-13-1
|-  style="background:#cfc;"
| 2011-02-05 || Win ||align=left| Yosuke Mizuochi || Bigbang 4|| Tokyo, Japan || KO (3 Knockdowns) || 3 || 2:22 || 22-13-1
|-  style="background:#cfc;"
| 2010-12-12 || Win ||align=left| Toshiki Taniyama || Krush First Generation King Tournaments ~Round.1~|| Korakuen Hall, Tokyo, Japan || KO (Taekwondo Back Kick then followed by punches) || 3 || || 22-12-1
|-  style="background:#cfc;"
| 2010-10-29 || Win ||align=left| Hiroki Namai || Krush EX "Road to the Championship" || Shinjuku Face, Tokyo, Japan || KO (Spinning Backfist) || 2 || || 21-12-1
|-  style="background:#cfc;"
| 2010-09-20 || Win ||align=left| Fumiya Sasaki || Krush.10 || Shinjuku Face, Tokyo, Japan || KO  || 3 || 1:28 || 20-12-1
|-  style="background:#fbb;"
| 2010-07-05 || Loss ||align=left| Yuta Kubo || K-1 World MAX 2010 -63kg Japan Tournament, Quarter Final || Bunkyo, Tokyo, Japan || Decision (Unanimous) || 3 || 3:00 || 19-12-1
|-  style="background:#cfc;"
| 2010-05-02 || Win ||align=left| Kosuke Komiyama || K-1 World MAX 2010 -63kg Japan Tournament Final 16 1st round || Bunkyo, Tokyo, Japan || Decision (Split) || 3 || 3:00 || 19-11-1
|-
! style=background:white colspan=9 |
|-  style="background:#cfc;"
| 2010-03-13 || Win ||align=left| Yoshi || Good Loser "Krush x Survivor" || Bunkyo, Tokyo, Japan || Decision (Unanimous) || 3 || 3:00 || 18-11-1
|-  style="background:#fbb;"
| 2009-11-22 || Loss ||align=left| Kan Itabashi || R.I.S.E. "R.I.S.E. 60" || Bunkyo, Tokyo, Japan || KO (Punches) || 2 || 2:29 || 17-11-1
|-
! style=background:white colspan=9 |
|-  style="background:#fbb;"
| 2009-08-14 || Loss ||align=left| Genki Yamamoto || Krush "Krush Lightweight GP 2009 -Opening Round.2-" Round of 16 || Bunkyo, Tokyo, Japan || Decision (Unanimous) || 3 || 3:00 || 17-10-1
|-  style="background:#fbb;"
| 2009-05-31 || Loss ||align=left| Xu Yan || The Challenger || Macau, China || Decision (Unanimous) || 3 || 3:00 || 17-9-1
|-  style="background:#fbb;"
| 2009-02-23 || Loss ||align=left| Yasuhito Shirasu || K-1 World MAX 2009 Japan Tournament Reserve match || Shibuya, Tokyo, Japan || Decision (Unanimous) || 3 || 3:00 || 17-8-1
|-  style="background:#fbb;"
| 2008-11-08 || Loss ||align=left| Su Hwan Lee || AJKF "Krush! -Kickboxing Destruction-" || Bunkyo, Tokyo, Japan || Decision (Split) || 4 (Ex.1) || 3:00 || 17-7-1
|-  style="background:#cfc;"
| 2008-08-31 || Win ||align=left| Kwang-Sik John || J-Network "Team Dragon Quest 2" || Bunkyo, Tokyo, Japan || KO (Right low kick) || 3 || 1:25 || 17-6-1
|-  style="background:#fbb;"
| 2008-02-02 || Loss ||align=left| Yasuhiro Kido || K-1 World MAX 2008 Japan Tournament Quarterfinal || Chiyoda, Tokyo, Japan || Decision (Unanimous) || 3 || 3:00 || 16-6-1
|-  style="background:#fbb;"
| 2007-10-25 || Loss ||align=left| Yuya Yamamoto || AJKF "Roman Kick Return Kickboxer of the best 60 Tournament Final || Bunkyo, Tokyo, Japan || Decision (Majority) || 3 || 3:00 || 16-5-1
|-  style="background:#cfc;"
| 2007-06-28 || Win ||align=left| Wing-Heung Pak || K-1 World MAX 2007 World Tournament Final Elimination Opening fight || Chiyoda, Tokyo, Japan || Decision (Unanimous) || 3 || 3:00 || 16-4-1
|-  style="background:#fbb;"
| 2007-04-04 || Loss ||align=left| Ian Schaffa || K-1 World MAX 2007 World Elite Showcase Super fight || Yokohama, Kanagawa, Japan || Decision (Unanimous) || 3 || 3:00 || 16-4
|-  style="background:#fbb;"
| 2007-02-05 || Loss ||align=left| Yoshihiro Sato || K-1 World MAX 2007 Japan Tournament Semifinal || Kōtō, Tokyo, Japan || Decision (Unanimous) || 3 || 3:00 || 16-3
|-  style="background:#cfc;"
| 2007-02-05 || Win ||align=left| Hiroki Shishido || K-1 World MAX 2007 Japan Tournament Quarterfinal|| Kōtō, Tokyo, Japan || Decision (Unanimous) || 3 || 3:00 || 16-2
|-  style="background:#cfc;"
| 2006-12-17 || Win ||align=left| Naoki Samukawa || R.I.S.E. Dead or Alive Tournament '06 || Kōtō, Tokyo, Japan || Decision (Unanimous) || 3 || 3:00 || 15-2
|-
! style=background:white colspan=9 |
|-  style="background:#cfc;"
| 2006-12-17 || Win ||align=left| Yuki || R.I.S.E. Dead or Alive Tournament '06 || Kōtō, Tokyo, Japan || KO || 2 || 1:58 || 14-2
|-  style="background:#cfc;"
| 2006-12-17 || Win ||align=left| Hideki Mizutani || R.I.S.E. Dead or Alive Tournament '06 || Kōtō, Tokyo, Japan || Decision (Unanimous) || 3 || 3:00 || 13-2
|-  style="background:#cfc;"
| 2006-11-03 || Win ||align=left| Kenji Kanai || Shoot Boxing World Tournament 2006 Opening match || Sumida, Tokyo, Japan || Decision (Unanimous) || 3 || 3:00 || 12-2
|-  style="background:#fbb;"
| 2006-06-25 || Loss ||align=left| Nobumitsu Sudo || R.I.S.E. Flash to Crush Tournament '06  || Kōtō, Tokyo, Japan || KO (Punches) || 2 || 1:28 || 11-2
|- style=""  bgcolor=#c5d2ea
| 2006-05-17 || Ex ||align=left| Shingo Garyu || J-Network "Go! Go! J-Net '06 ~Invading the Dragon" || Bunkyo, Tokyo, Japan || No Decision || 1 || 3:00
|-  style="background:#cfc;"
| 2006-02-09 || Win ||align=left| Hiroshi Sekimoto || Shoot Boxing 2006 Neo Orthros Series 1st || Bunkyo, Tokyo, Japan || Decision (Unanimous) || 3 || 3:00 || 11-1
|-  style="background:#cfc;"
| 2005-12-18 || Win ||align=left| Hiroshi Mizumachi || R.I.S.E. Dead or Alive Tournament '05 || Kōtō, Tokyo, Japan || KO (Spinning back kick) || 2 || 1:33 || 10-1
|-  style="background:#cfc;"
| 2005-10-30 || Win ||align=left| Crazy884 || R.I.S.E. XIX || Ōta, Tokyo, Japan || KO (Right hook) || 1 || 2:03 || 9-1
|-  style="background:#cfc;"
| 2005-09-25 || Win ||align=left| Taiga Yamaguchi || Shoot Boxing 20th Anniversary Series 4th|| Bunkyo, Tokyo, Japan || Decision (Unanimous) || 5 || 3:00 || 8-1
|-  style="background:#cfc;"
| 2005-07-31 || Win ||align=left| Yuki || R.I.S.E. XVII || Ōta, Tokyo, Japan || TKO (Corner stoppage) || 2 || 0:34 || 7-1
|-  style="background:#cfc;"
| 2005-05-29 || Win ||align=left| Yuji Kitano || R.I.S.E. XVI || Ōta, Tokyo, Japan || Decision (Split) || 3 || 3:00 || 6-1
|-  style="background:#cfc;"
| 2005-01-30 || Win ||align=left| Takayoshi Kitayama || R.I.S.E. XII || Minato, Tokyo, Japan || Decision (Majority) || 3 || 3:00 || 5-1
|-  style="background:#cfc;"
| 2004-11-28 || Win ||align=left| Taisho || Future Fighter IKUSA -Sora- Gangstarz || Kōtō, Tokyo, Japan || TKO (Punches) || 3 || 0:42 || 4-1
|-  style="background:#cfc;"
| 2004-07-04 || Win ||align=left| Shannon Forrester || R.I.S.E. The Low Of The Ring -Japan vs. World- || Kōtō, Tokyo, Japan || Decision (Majority) || 3 || 3:00 || 3-1
|-  style="background:#fbb;"
| 2004-04-29 || Loss ||align=left| Keiichi Samukawa || R.I.S.E. VII || Ōta, Tokyo, Japan || Decision (Split) || 4(Ex.1) || 3:00 || 2-1
|-  style="background:#cfc;"
| 2003-12-23 || Win ||align=left| Masaki Shimamura || R.I.S.E. Dead or Alive Tournament  || Kōtō, Tokyo, Japan || Decision (Unanimous) || 3 || 3:00 || 2-0
|-  style="background:#cfc;"
| 2003-09-28 || Win ||align=left| Tomoaki Suehiro || R.I.S.E. Fourth || Ōta, Tokyo, Japan || Decision (Unanimous) || 3 || 3:00 || 1-0
|-
| colspan=9 | Legend:

References

External links
 
 
 
 

Living people
1980 births
Japanese male taekwondo practitioners
Japanese male kickboxers
Lightweight kickboxers
Welterweight kickboxers
Sportspeople from Kanagawa Prefecture
Kanagawa University alumni
People from Murrysville, Pennsylvania